L-1 Identity Solutions, Inc.  is a large American defense contractor in Connecticut. It was formed on August 29, 2006, from a merger of Viisage Technology, Inc. and Identix Incorporated. It specializes in selling face recognition systems, electronic passports such as Fly Clear, and other biometric technology to governments such as the United States and Saudi Arabia. It also licenses technology to other companies internationally, including China.

On July 26, 2011, Safran (NYSE Euronext Paris: SAF) acquired L-1 Identity Solutions, Inc. for a total cash amount of USD 1.09 billion. L-1 is now part of Morpho's MorphoTrust department.

Bioscrypt is a biometrics research, development and manufacturing company purchased by L-1 Identity Solutions. It provides fingerprint IP readers for physical access control systems, Facial recognition system readers for contactless access control authentication and OEM fingerprint modules for embedded applications. According to IMS Research, Bioscrypt has been the world market leader in biometric access control for enterprises (since 2006) with a worldwide market share of over 13%. In 2011, Bioscrypt was sold to Safran Morpho.

References

External links
 L-1 Identity Solutions homepage
 Morpho's homepage

Companies listed on the New York Stock Exchange
Companies based in Stamford, Connecticut
Software companies established in 2006
Facial recognition software
Data mining and machine learning software
American companies established in 2006